Goli Vrh is a dispersed settlement in the Municipality of Gorenja Vas–Poljane in the Upper Carniola region of Slovenia. It includes part of the hamlet of Suhi Dol in the eastern part of the settlement.

Rupnik Line

Goli Vrh lies along the route of the Rupnik Line, a fortification system dating from the 1930s. The Goli Vrh bunker is one of the largest preserved bunkers in the western part of the line.

References

External links 

Goli Vrh on Geopedia

Populated places in the Municipality of Gorenja vas-Poljane